Anadara chemnitzii, common name Chemnitz's ark clam, is a saltwater clam in the family Arcidae, the ark shells. This species is found in the Caribbean Sea, from Texas to the West Indies and Brazil.

References

chemnitzii
Bivalves described in 1851